Gravesend and Northfleet Electric Tramways operated a tramway service between Gravesend, Kent and Northfleet between 1902 and 1929.

History

In 1901 the Gravesend, Rosherville and Northfleet Tramways were taken over by the Gravesend and Northfleet Electric Tramways, a subsidiary of British Electric Traction. The tramway was converted from 3 ft 6in gauge to standard gauge and electrified.

Services started on 2 August 1902 with a route from Galley Hill, Swanscombe to Denton. In 1903 New tram routes opened from Pelham Road to Perry Street, Windmill Street to Old Road and a connection to the Leather Bottle, Northfleet.

In 1921 it obtained two second hand cars from the Taunton Tramway.

Closure

The tramway service closed on 29 February 1929.

References

External links
 Gravesend and Northfleet Electric Tramways at the British Tramway Company Badges and Buttons website.

Tram transport in England
History of Gravesend, Kent
1902 establishments in England
1929 disestablishments in England